René Shaki Joensen (born 8 February 1993) is a Faroese international footballer who plays as a midfielder for KÍ.

Club career
Joensen started his professional career with Brøndby in Denmark. He did not appear in any matches for his team since his Danish Superliga debut in the 2011–12 season. In January 2014, he returned to the Faroe Islands to play for HB Tórshavn.

On 6 December 2021, Joensen signed a one-year contract with KÍ, starting 1 January 2022.

International career
He played youth football for the Faroe Islands, before making his senior international debut in 2012.

Personal life
His father is from Israel.

International goals
Scores and results list Faroe Islands' goal tally first.

References

1993 births
Living people
People from Tórshavn
Faroese footballers
Faroe Islands international footballers
Faroe Islands under-21 international footballers
Faroese expatriate footballers
Brøndby IF players
Vendsyssel FF players
Grindavík men's football players
Havnar Bóltfelag players
KÍ Klaksvík players
Danish Superliga players
Úrvalsdeild karla (football) players
Faroe Islands Premier League players
Expatriate men's footballers in Denmark
Association football defenders
Faroese expatriate sportspeople in Iceland
Expatriate footballers in Iceland
Faroe Islands youth international footballers
Faroese people of Israeli descent